Aneura is a genus of liverworts in the family Aneuraceae.

Species 
The 2016 world checklist of hornworts and liverworts listed the following species, placed into three categories.
Fully accepted
Aneura blasioides 
Aneura crateriformis 
Aneura hirsuta 
Aneura marianensis 
Aneura maxima 
Aneura mirabilis 
Aneura novaguineensis 
Aneura pinguis 
Insufficient knowledge
Aneura brasiliensis 
Aneura cerebrata 
Aneura crumii 
Aneura eachamensis 
Aneura erronea 
Aneura eskuchei 
Aneura gemmifera 
Aneura gibbsiana 
Aneura glaucescens 
Aneura imbricata 
Aneura kaguaensis 
Aneura keniae 
Aneura latissima 
Aneura macrostachya 
Aneura novaecaledoniae 
Aneura pellucida 
Aneura polyantha 
Aneura punctata 
Aneura rodwayi 
Aneura rotangicola 
Aneura sharpii 
Aneura subcanaliculata 
Serious doubts as to validity
Aneura amboinensis 
Aneura augustae 
Aneura biflora 
Aneura brevissima 
Aneura crinita 
Aneura densa 
Aneura denticulata 
Aneura giangena 
Aneura goebeliana 
Aneura hunsteinii 
Aneura latemultifida 
Aneura ledermannii 
Aneura nymannii 
Aneura roraimensis 
Aneura serrulata 
Aneura singalangana 
Aneura subledermannii 
Aneura subtenerrima 
Aneura vincentina 

Names brought to synonymy
 Aneura elegans, a synonym for Riccardia elegans

References 

 Brown, E.A.; Braggins, J.E. 1989: A revision of the genus Riccardia S.F. Gray in New Zealand with notes on the genus Aneura Dum. Journal of the Hattori Botanical Laboratory, (66): 1–132.

External links 
 
 

Liverwort genera
Metzgeriales